Albert Henry Gook (c. 1914 – 15 December 1964) was an Australian rules footballer who played for the Perth Football Club in the Western Australian National Football League (WANFL). He was the league's leading goalkicker in 1939.

Gook began his career with South Perth in the Band of Hope Association, His senior debut for Perth came in 1933. Playing either as a centreman or at full-forward, he became known as a goal-kicking specialist, leading the club's goalkicking from the 1934 season through to the 1939 season. Gook led the WANFL's goalkicking in 1939, kicking 102 goals from 18 games. This included hauls of 10 goals against  and 16 goals against . Both his season tally and his tally against West Perth are club records. Gook also represented the WANFL in seven interstate and carnival matches between 1934 and 1938, kicking 20 goals, including six against the VFL in 1938. In his final season, 1940, he took out Perth's best and fairest award, playing mainly as a centreman. In 1941, Gook suffered a fractured skull and leg in a motorcycle accident while riding pillion on Scarborough Road, with the motorcyclist, Alexander Brown Burton Stevens, being killed. Gook died in Dianella in December 1964, aged 50. In 1999, Gook was named at full-forward in Perth's Team of the Century.

Notes
 The current Perth Football Club was known as the "Victoria Park Football Club" in the 1934 and 1935 seasons.

References

1910s births
1964 deaths
Perth Football Club players
Australian rules footballers from Perth, Western Australia
Sportsmen from Western Australia
Date of birth missing